Jacob Gløersen (28 May 1852–21 August 1912) was a Norwegian painter.

Biography
Gløersen was born at Nissedal in Telemark, Norway. He was the son of parish priest Johan Gløersen (1810-1890) and Charlotte Cecilie Dahl (1812-1892). He took matriculation at Kristiansand Cathedral School in 1872. He studied with Olaf Isaachsen in Kristiansand in 1872, at Knud Bergslien's painting school from 1872 to 1875, and with Otto Seitz in Munich in 1880. In 1881, he debuted at the Christiania Art Society. He was awarded a Silver Medal at Paris in 1889 and a Gold Medal at Munich in 1891. He traveled on an endowment  to Copenhagen, Amsterdam, Antwerp and Paris during 1893. He was awarded the St. Olav's Medal in 1910.

His art often reflected an unsentimental image  of the Norwegian peasant environment in Numedal, Valdres, Hadeland and Lillehammer.
He is represented at the National Gallery of Norway with several paintings, including På rugdepost from 1887 and Vinterdag  from 1900.

Selected works
Liden Læselyst (1883)
Doktorbesøg (1885) 
Snefog (1890) 
Kveld (1892)
Vinter  (1894) 
Kulmile (1896)

References

1852 births
1912 deaths
People from Nissedal
19th-century Norwegian painters
Recipients of the St. Olav's Medal
20th-century Norwegian painters
Norwegian male painters
19th-century Norwegian male artists
20th-century Norwegian male artists